The Games Machine is a video game magazine that was published from 1987 until 1990 in the United Kingdom by Newsfield, which also published CRASH, Zzap!64, Amtix! and other magazines.

History
The magazine ran head to head with Future's recently launched ACE and EMAP's long running C&VG magazines. Unhappy with the profits from the title Newsfield decided to end the title in 1990.

However Newsfield would, more or less, continue with a multi format magazine with Raze.  This new title would concentrate on the ever rising consoles like the Mega Drive as well as the established NES and Master System.

The Games Machine in Italy

A magazine with the same name is still being published in Italy. While it started as an Italian translated version of the British magazine, it currently publishes original articles, and is one of the best selling PC games magazines in Italy.

References

External links
Archived The Games Machine magazines on the Internet Archive

1987 establishments in the United Kingdom
1990 disestablishments in the United Kingdom
Bi-monthly magazines published in the United Kingdom
Monthly magazines published in the United Kingdom
Video game magazines published in the United Kingdom
Defunct computer magazines published in the United Kingdom
Home computer magazines
Magazines established in 1987
Magazines disestablished in 1990